Sindology may refer to:
A misspelling of Sindhology, the study of the province of Sindh, Pakistan
A misspelling of sindonology, the study of the Shroud of Turin